May High School is a public high school located in May, Texas (USA) and classified as a 1A school by the UIL. It is part of the May Independent School District located in northeastern Brown County. In 2015, the school was rated "Met Standard" by the Texas Education Agency.

Athletics
The May Tigers compete in these sports - 

Baseball
Basketball
Cross Country
6-Man Football
Golf
Track and Field
Softball
Hot dog eating contest

State titles
6-Man Football 
1977(6M)

References

External links
 May ISD website

Schools in Brown County, Texas
Public high schools in Texas
Public middle schools in Texas